Santucci's armillary sphere is a Ptolemaic armillary sphere at the Museo Galileo in Florence, the largest existing in the world.

Begun on March 4, 1588, and completed on May 6, 1593, this large armillary sphere was built under the supervision of Antonio Santucci at the request of Ferdinand I de' Medici. The sphere represents the "universal machine" of the world according to the concepts developed by Aristotle and perfected by Ptolemy. The terrestrial globe is placed at the center, and it also displays territories that were still relatively little known at the time.

The device was restored in the 19th century but is now incomplete and some of its parts are mismatched. The wooden parts of the sphere are elaborately painted and covered with fine gold leaf. The sphere rests on a stand with four sirens.

This model is similar to a smaller one built by Santucci in 1582 for King Philip II of Spain, now in the Escorial Library.

References

Further reading
Meucci, Ferdinando. La sfera armillare di Tolomeo. Tipografia del Vocabolario, 1876.

Astronomical instruments
1593 works
1590s sculptures
16th-century maps and globes